Michael E. Chernew is an American expert in the field of health economics. He is a member of the Medicare Payment Advisory Commission, the National Academy of Sciences and the Institute of Medicine.

Chernew graduated from the University of Pennsylvania with a bachelor's degree and his PhD in economics is from Stanford University, where he focused on applied microeconomics and econometrics.

References

Health economists
Members of the National Academy of Medicine
Stanford University alumni
University of Pennsylvania alumni
Living people
21st-century American economists
Members of the United States National Academy of Sciences
Year of birth missing (living people)